The Rev. Auguste Lemonnier, C.S.C. (April 12, 1839 – October 29, 1874) was a French-American Catholic priest, and fourth President of the University of Notre Dame from 1872 to 1874.
The nephew of Rev. Edward Sorin, he traveled from France to Notre Dame in February 1861, where he completed his seminary studies and was ordained a priest on November 4, 1863. At Notre Dame, he was Prefect of Discipline (1863-1865), Prefect of Religion (1865-1866), and the President (1872-1874).

President of the University of Notre Dame 
During his tenure as president and vice-president, Lemonnier strengthened the university's curriculum by adding more courses and faculty in math and the sciences. He began construction of the university library (now Bond Hall), which was named in his honor. He was amicable and beloved by the student body for his closeness to the needs of students. He died in office, at the young age of thirty five.

References

External links

*

Presidents of the University of Notre Dame
19th-century American Roman Catholic priests
Congregation of Holy Cross
1839 births
1874 deaths